Paracolax is a genus of litter moths of the family Erebidae. The genus was erected by Jacob Hübner in 1825.

Species
Paracolax albinotata (Butler, 1879) Japan
Paracolax albopunctata Rothschild, 1915 New Guinea
Paracolax angulata (Wileman, 1915) Japan, Taiwan
Paracolax bipuncta Owada, 1982 Japan
Paracolax brunnescens Rothschild, 1920 Sumatra
Paracolax castanea Rothschild, 1920 Sumatra
Paracolax contigua (Leech, 1900) Japan, Taiwan, China
Paracolax fascialis (Leech, 1889) Japan, Korea, Amur, Ussuri
Paracolax fentoni (Butler, 1879) Japan, Taiwan, Korea, China, Ussuri
Paracolax griseata Rothschild, 1915 New Guinea
Paracolax grisescens Holloway, 2008 Borneo
Paracolax japonica Owada, 1987 Japan (Honshu)
Paracolax montanus Holloway, 2008 Borneo
Paracolax ocellatus Holloway, 2008 Borneo
Paracolax ochrescens Holloway, 2008 Borneo
Paracolax pacifica Inoue, Sugi, Kuroko, Moriuti & Kawabe, 1982 Japan
Paracolax pectinatus Holloway, 2008 Borneo, Peninsular Malaysia
Paracolax pryeri (Butler, 1879) Japan, Taiwan
Paracolax tokui Inoue, Sugi, Kuroko, Moriuti & Kawabe, 1982 Japan
Paracolax trilinealis (Bremer, 1864) Japan, Sakhalin, Korea, southeastern Siberia, China
Paracolax tristalis (Fabricius, 1794) southern and central Europe, Japan, Sakhalin, China, Amur, Ussuri, Siberia - clay fan-foot

References

Herminiinae
Heteroneura genera